The Sphynx cat (pronounced) also known as the Canadian Sphynx, is a breed of cat known for its lack of fur. Hairlessness in cats is a naturally occurring genetic mutation, and the Sphynx was developed through selective breeding of these animals, starting in the 1960s. 

According to breed standards, the skin should have the texture of chamois leather, as it has fine hairs, or the cat may be completely hairless. Whiskers may be present, either whole or broken, or may be totally absent. The cats have a narrow, long head and webbed feet. Their skin is the color that their fur would be, and all the usual cat markings (solid, point, van, tabby, tortie, etc.) may be found on the Sphynx cat's skin. Because they have no fur, Sphynx cats lose body heat more readily than coated cats, making them both warm to the touch and prone to seeking out warm places.

Breed standards
The breed standards are defined by The International Cat Association (TICA):
 Wedge-shaped heads with prominent cheekbones
 Large, lemon-shaped eyes
 Very large ears with hair on inside, but soft down on outside base
 Well-muscled, powerful neck of medium length
 Medium length torso, barrel-chested, and full, round abdomen, sometimes called a pot belly
 Paw pads thicker than other cats, giving the appearance of walking on cushions
 Whiplike, tapering tail from body to tip, (sometimes with fur all over tail or a puff of fur on the tip, like a lion)
 Muscular body

History of the cat breed
The contemporary breed of Sphynx cat is distinct from the Russian hairless cat breeds, like Peterbald and Donskoy. Although hairless cats have been reported throughout history, breeders in Europe have been developing the Sphynx breed since the early 1960s. Two different sets of hairless felines discovered in North America in the 1970s provided the foundation cats for what was shaped into the existing Sphynx breed.

The current American and European Sphynx breed is descended from two lines of natural mutations:
 Dermis and Epidermis (1975) barn cats from the Pearson family of Wadena, Minnesota
 Bambi, Punkie and Paloma (1978) stray cats found in Toronto, Ontario, Canada, and raised by Shirley Smith

Toronto 
The Canadian Sphynx breed was started in 1966 in Toronto, Ontario when a hairless male kitten named Prune was born to a black and white domestic shorthair queen (Elizabeth). The kitten was mated with his mother (called backcrossing), which produced one more naked kitten. Together with a few naked kittens found later, the cat Prune was the first attempt to create a hairless breed.

After purchasing these cats in 1966 and initially referring to them as "Moonstones" and "Canadian Hairless", Ridyadh Bawa, a science graduate of the University of Toronto, combined efforts with his mother Yania, a longtime Siamese breeder, and Keese and Rita Tenhoves to develop a breed of cats which was subsequently renamed as Sphynx. The Bawas and the Tenhoves were the first individuals able to determine the autosomal recessive nature of the Sphynx gene for hairlessness while also being successful in transforming this knowledge into a successful breeding program with kittens which were eventually capable of reproducing. The Tenhoves were initially able to obtain for the new breed provisional showing status through the Cat Fanciers' Association (CFA) but ultimately had the status revoked in 1971, when it was felt by the CFA Board that the breed had concerns over fertility.

The first breeders had rather vague ideas about Sphynx genetics and faced a number of problems. The genetic pool was very limited and many kittens died. There was also a problem with many of the females suffering convulsions. In 1978, cat breeder Shirley Smith found three hairless kittens on the streets of her neighborhood. In 1983, she sent two of them to Dr. Hugo Hernandez in the Netherlands to breed the two kittens, named Punkie and Paloma, to a white Devon Rex named Curare van Jetrophin. The resulting litter produced five kittens: two males from this litter (Q. Ramses and Q. Ra) were used, along with Punkie's half-sister, Paloma.

Minnesota 
The first noted naturally occurring foundation Sphynx originated as hairless stray barn cats in Wadena, Minnesota, at the farm of Milt and Ethelyn Pearson. The Pearsons identified hairless kittens occurring in several litters of their domestic shorthair barn cats in the mid-1970s. Two hairless female kittens born in 1975 and 1976, Epidermis and Dermis, were sold to Oregon breeder Kim Mueske, and became an important part of the Sphynx breeding program. Also working with the Pearson line of cats was breeder Georgiana Gattenby of Brainerd, Minnesota, who outcrossed with Cornish Rex cats.

Genetics and breeding

Other hairless breeds may have body shapes or temperaments that differ from those of Sphynx standards. There are, for example, new hairless breeds, including the Don Sphynx and the Peterbald from Russia, which arose from their own spontaneous gene mutations. The standard for the Sphynx differs between cat associations such as The International Cat Association (TICA), Fédération Internationale Féline (FIFE) and Cat Fanciers' Association (CFA).

Breeding 
In 2010, DNA analysis confirmed that Sphynx hairlessness was produced by a different allele of the same gene that produces the short curly hair of the Devon Rex (termed the "re" allele), with the Sphynx's allele being incompletely dominant over the Devon allele and both being recessive to the wild type. The Sphynx's allele is termed "hr", for hairless. The only allowable outcross breeds in the CFA are now the American Shorthair and Domestic Shorthair. Other associations may vary, and the Russian Blue is a permitted outcross in the Governing Council of the Cat Fancy (GCCF). In Europe, mainly the Devon Rex has been used for outcrosses.

Genetics 
The Sphynx's hairlessness is produced by a mutation in the same gene that produces the short curly coat of the Devon Rex. Moreover, it was found that the curly coat of Selkirk Rex cats is also associated with this gene.

The gene encodes keratin 71 (KRT71) and is responsible for the keratinization of the hair follicle. The Sphynx's mutation leads to a complete loss of function where the structure of the hair is damaged so that the hair can be formed but is easily dislodged. In the Devon Rex mutation, a residual activity of the protein still exists. The Selkirk Rex allele (sadr) is dominant over the wild type gene, which is dominant over the Devon Rex allele (re) and the Sphynx (hr), which forms an allelic series of : KRT71SADRE > KRT71+ > KRT71re > KRT71hr.

Behavior

Sphynx are known for their extroverted behavior. They display a high level of energy, intelligence, curiosity and affection for their owners. They are one of the more dog-like breeds of cats, frequently greeting their owners at the door and friendly when meeting strangers.

Care

Although Sphynx cats lack a coat to shed or groom, they are not maintenance-free. Body oils, which would normally be absorbed by the hair, tend to build up on the skin. As a result, regular bathing is usually necessary weekly or bi-weekly. Care should be taken to limit the Sphynx cat's exposure to outdoor sunlight at length, as they can develop sunburn and skin damage similar to that of humans. In general, Sphynx cats should never be allowed outdoors unattended, as they have limited means to conserve body heat when it is cold. In some climates, owners provide coats or other clothing in the winter to help them conserve body heat.

While they lack much of the fur of other cat breeds, Sphynxes are not necessarily hypoallergenic. Allergies to cats are triggered by a protein called Fel d1, not cat hair itself. Fel d1 is a protein primarily found in cat saliva and sebaceous glands. Those with cat allergies may react to direct contact with Sphynx cats. Even though reports exist that some people with allergies successfully tolerate Sphynx cats, they are fewer than those who have allergic reactions. 

Sphynx cats can also have more ear wax than most hairy domestic cats because they have little to no hair in their ears. Dirt, skin oils (sebum) and ear wax accumulates in the ears, and needs to be cleaned out on a weekly basis, usually before bath time.

The Sphynx breed also tends to accumulate oils and debris under the nails as well as the skin fold above the nail due to the lack of fur, so, like the ears, the nails and surrounding skin folds need to be cleaned properly as well. Due to these factors the breed may require more grooming than a typical domestic cat with fur. Specialty products for this cat have been developed, though they still require more grooming than most breeds.

Health issues
The Sphynx faces challenges because of its lack of protective fur. Skin cancer may be a problem if exposed to sunlight for long durations of time. 

The lack of hair can cause health issues with kittens in the first weeks of life because of susceptibility to respiratory infections. Reputable breeders should not let their kittens go to new homes without being at least 14 weeks of age to ensure the kitten is mature enough to cope in a new environment.

Hypertrophic cardiomyopathy 
The breed does have instances of the genetic disorder hypertrophic cardiomyopathy (HCM). Other domestic cat breeds prone to HCM include Persian, Ragdoll, Norwegian Forest cat, Siberian cats, British Shorthair and Maine Coon; however, any domestic cat including mixed breeds can acquire HCM. Studies are being undertaken to understand the links in breeding and the disorder. Cats are screened for HCM disease with echocardiography (ultrasound of the heart), as well as with additional tests determined by the veterinarian cardiologist including electrocardiogram (EKG, ECG), chest radiographs (X-rays), and/or blood tests.

The Sphynx cat has a high rate of heart disease, either as HCM or mitral valve dysplasia. In a 2012 study of 114 Sphynx cats, 34% were found to have an abnormal heart, with 16 cats having mitral valve dysplasia and 23 cats having HCM. These prevalences were found in cats with an average age of 2.62 years. Male cats developed more severe disease than female cats and often developed it earlier, at an average age of 19 months for males and 29 months for females. Since the prevalence of genetic heart disease is high in this breed, many breeders will recommend screening for HCM yearly.

As HCM progresses into an advanced stage, cats may experience congestive heart failure (CHF) or thromboembolism.

Congenital myasthenic syndrome 
Congenital myasthenic syndrome (CMS) previously referred to as muscular dystrophy, myopathy or spasticity, is a type of inherited neuromuscular disorder associated with alpha-dystroglycan deficiency, found in Sphynx and in Devon Rex cats as well as variants of these breeds, which can occur between the first 3 to 23 weeks of their life. This condition has also been described, but is rarely seen. Cats affected by CMS show generalized muscle weakness and fatigue, as well as ventroflexion of the head and neck, head bobbing, and scapulae protrusion.

In popular culture
The Sphynx cat has been dubbed by many Internet Memes the "Bingus" and is the subject of many memes that call the species as such.

References

Cat breeds
Cat breeds originating in Canada
Hairless cat breeds
Rare cat breeds
Culture of Ontario
Articles containing video clips